Muchenan (also Romanized as Mūchenān; also known as Mūkhīān and Mūkhīyān) is a village in Radkan Rural District, in the Central District of Chenaran County, Razavi Khorasan Province, Iran. At the 2006 census, its population was 2,057, in 503 families.

References 

Populated places in Chenaran County